Skorenovac (Serbian: Скореновац; Hungarian: Székelykeve; German: Skorenowatz,; Banat Bulgarian: Gjurgevo) is a village located in the Kovin municipality, in the South Banat District of Serbia, in the Autonomous Province of Vojvodina. The village has a Hungarian ethnic majority (86.71%) and a population of 2,574 (2002 census).

Geography
The closest towns are Kovin (6 km), Smederevo (17 km), Pančevo (30 km), and Belgrade (46 km).

History

General history
The village named Gyurgyova-Rádayfalva (Đurđevo) existed between 1869 and 1886 at the location between Banatski Brestovac and Danube river. In 1869, the population of Gyurgyova numbered 396 people, later, 1880 census, the population number drop to 298 people. After initial settlement, which included Hungarian (Palóc) families from Banatsko Novo Selo (hun: Újfalu), Jermenovci (hun: Ürményháza), Sándorfalva, Szeged county and Banatski Dušanovac (hun: Szőlősudvarnok, ger: Rogendorf), in 1883 came the first Székely settlement with total of 645 families or around 2,000 individuals. The village was then known as Nagygyörgyfalva (1883–1886).

Later, in 1886, the population of the village was resettled to the location of present-day Skorenovac and Ivanovo. The reason for resettlement to Skorenovac and Ivanovo was the flooding of the Danube river and the yearly annihilation of property in the village and its agricultural land. At the same time, the inhabitants' lives were in constant danger.

The village of Skorenovac (named Székelykeve 1886–1922) was founded in 1886, during the time of Franz Joseph I. In the time of the village settlement, its territory was situated in the Torontál Vármegye (County) of the Kingdom of Hungary. In 1888 it had 506 houses and in 1910 the village had 685 houses. In 1912 it was situated in the Temes Vármegye (County). From 1922, the village is known as Skorenovac, from German Skorenowatz.

The majority of the original settlers were Székely Hungarians who came from Bukovina, and also, in the same time frame, some German families from Plandište and Pločice and some Bulgarian families from Dudeștii Vechi (hun: Óbesenyő, ger: Altbeschenowa, Banat Bulgarian: Stár Bišnov) are settled in Skorenovac. Skorenovac is the southernmost village in Europe with a Hungarian majority.

Economy, religion, and education
1885 - The first steady teacher came to the village of Gyurgyova (then in 1886 to Skorenovac). His name was János Mischel.
1886 - The first judge and mayor of Skorenovac was Ágoston Kollár (1886–1890).
1889 - The school building was finished. The teachers in the school were: Johan Steiner (Principal and teacher), János Mischel (teacher), Ottilia Müller (teacher), and Etelka Somogyi (teacher). In school year 1905/1906 school had 561 students. Elementary school, in that time, was up to grade 6. School Board members in 1930's were Imre László, Mihály Fehér, Francz Wintergerst, Bóna Boszilkov, József Medgyessy and András Varga.
1892 - December 18, a Church (Roman Catholic) was erected. The first priest was Ferenc Deleme (1892–1898).
1894 - November 25, foundation of the Farmers Creditors Collective. Its president was Fr. Ferenc Deleme, and the collective had 71 members.
1895 - October 6, Library was founded, and had a 50 members. President was Ferenc Deleme, while the librarian was János Hajagos.
1898 - The first "shared" doctor in the village, Dr. József Klein.
1899 - The voluntary fire brigade was established; its president was Johan Kirchgäsner and the fire chief was Johan Mischel, while the brigade had 60 members.
1900 - The first permanent doctor, Dr. Edét Urbanek, arrived in the village.
1906 - Hunters association founded, with 14 members. Founders were Gyula Szabatka and Dezsö Töry.
1912 - The first motorized "Big Mill" is opened, owned by Katalin Rüger. It worked until the mid-1970s, when it was closed.
1913 - April 27, "Hangya" Collective of Consumer Association is established. President was Aladár Wikel, and the association had 128 members. A merchandise store was opened the same year.
1924 - The Red Cross started humanitarian work, but the official establishment of the organization was in 1931. The organization had 57 members, while the president was Dr. Imre László.
1925 - The Culture Association (hun: Kultúrszövetség, ger: Kulturbund) was founded. Since 1948, it is known as KUD "Petõfi Sándor".
1932 - Craftsman Association is established with András Bircsák, shoemaker, as president.
1932 - June 14, FK Plavi Dunav was founded. President was Milivoj Đurkin, and vicepresident Dr. Imre László. Team players were: Antal Fazekas, János Szirák, Stanko Erdeljan, József Borsós, János Brasnyó, József Boszilkov, Pubi Hubert, István Kiss, Imre Galac, Tamás Jung, Dezsö Kovačević, István Urbán, Imre Komáromi, János Migléci, Mile Perić, Đuro Stanisavljević and Slavko Ivkov.

Population and major ethnic groups

Chart

Anthropology

Székely community

The names of the villages in Bukovina from where the Székely settlers come are (in Hungarian with their Romanian equivalents): Istensegits (rom: Tibeni), Fogadjisten (rom: Iacobești), Hadikfalva (rom: Dornești), Józseffalva (rom: Vornicenii Mici), and Andrásfalva (rom: Maneuți). These villages are today in Romania, Suceava County, Bukovina; the closest bigger places are Rădăuţi and Botoşani.

The Bukovina Székely who settled in Skorenovac, Ivanovo, and Vojlovica are originally from Madéfalva (rom: Siculeni) village in the county of Csik (Harghita), Erdély (Transylvania), today in Romania. The Székelys of Bukovina in general are from the part of Erdély which is unofficially named the Székelyföld, which included Csikszék, Marosszék, Aranyosszék, Udvarhelyszék, and Háromszék counties of the historical Kingdom of Hungary.

Families, by original settlement
From Andrásfalva: Daradics, Csiszer, Erõs, Fábián, Gál, Geczõ, György, Illés, Jakab, János, Katona, Kelemen, Kemény, Kis, Koródi, Kovács, Lakatos, László, Lipina, Lukács, Müller, Palkó, Pásztor, Petres, Péter, Hompot, Husori, Sebestyén, Schidt, Szakács, Szatmári, Ranc and Varga.

From Istensegits: Ambrus, Barabás, Bartis, Béres, Bot, Borbandi, Bõte, Buzás, Dudli, Faluközi, Finnya, Fülöp, Gyõrfi, János, Kató, Lovász, Magyaros, Makrai, Miklós, Nagy, Nyistor, Pék, Sánta, Szabo, Szász, Szõte, Tamás, Urkon and Váncsa.

From Fogadjisten: Ambrus, Barabás, Gáspár, Kuruc, Papp, Váci, Szabó, and Székely.

From Hadikfalva: Beréti, Bréti, Biro, Csiki, Dani, Erdõs, Fazekas, Fodor, Forrai, Galambos, Kerekes, Kis, Kozma, Kozsán, Kölõ, and Skasszián.

From Józseffalva: Kurkó, Kusár, Palló, Mákszem, Mezei, Székely and Várda.

Famous villagers
Zoltán Dani, the ethnic Hungarian commander of a Serbian anti-aircraft battery which shot down a United States Air Force Lockheed F-117 Nighthawk stealth fighter on March 27, 1999, the only F-117 ever lost in combat.
Zoltán Sebescen, was a German former professional footballer who played as a right-back or right winger (His parents were leaved and born in Skorenovac).

Gallery

See also 
 List of places in Serbia
 List of cities, towns and villages in Vojvodina
 Székelys of Bukovina
 Banat Bulgarians
 List of Székely settlements

References 

 Skorenovac története - Szabatka Gyula ( Publisher R. Oberläuter, Kovin, Kingdom of Yugoslavia, 1936.)
 Jovan Erdeljanović, Srbi u Banatu, Novi Sad, 1992.
 Slobodan Ćurčić, Broj stanovnika Vojvodine, Novi Sad, 1996.
 Mgr. Erős Lajos, Adalékok a Zrenjanini-Nagybecskereki Egyházmegye történetéhez, 1993. (Additamenta ad historiam Diocesis Zrenjaninensis-Nagybecskerekensis)

External links 

 Székelykeve word - News in Hungarian
Skorenovac
 Samu Borovszky: Temes vármegye (S. 94 u. 95 Székelykeve и Gyorgyevóra)
Weeding traditions

Populated places in Serbian Banat
Populated places in South Banat District
Kovin